Breckenbeds Junior High School was a secondary school in Low Fell, Gateshead, Tyne and Wear, United Kingdom.  The school taught pupils aged 11–14 and acted as a feeder school for Heathfield Senior School.  The school closed as Breckenbeds in September 1996.

The Breckenbeds site was redeveloped to provide additional capacity for 14-18 year old pupils that had previously studied at the defunct Heathfield Senior High School.  The newly merged schools reopened on the Breckenbeds site as Joseph Swan (since 2019 Grace College).

footballer Paul Gascoigne and conductor John Wilson were its most famous pupils.

References

Defunct schools in Gateshead
Educational institutions disestablished in 1996
1996 disestablishments in England